Aristaeopsis is a monotypic genus of deepwater prawn. Its only species Aristaeopsis edwardsiana, commonly known as Carabineros shrimp or cardinal prawn, is the target of commercial fisheries. The scientific name honours Henri Milne-Edwards

References

Dendrobranchiata
Monotypic decapod genera
Edible crustaceans
Commercial crustaceans